Mykyta Tkachov (born August 15, 1993) is a Ukrainian footballer who plays with FC Vorkuta in the Canadian Soccer League.

Career

Ukraine 
Tkachov began playing at the academy level in 2010 with FC Helios Kharkiv academy team. In 2012, he signed with FC Kryvbas Kryvyi Rih in the Ukrainian Premier League, but failed to make an appearance for the senior team. The following season he played in the Ukrainian Second League with PFC Shakhtar Sverdlovsk., and later with FC Krystal Kherson. In 2014, he played in the Ukrainian Second League with FC Poltava. In 2015, he assisted NK Veres Rivne in securing promotion to the Ukrainian First League.

In 2016, he returned to the Ukrainian First League to play with FC Inhulets Petrove.

Canada 
He played abroad in the winter of 2017 in the Arena Premier League with Ukraine AC at the indoor level. In 2020, he signed a two year contract with FC Vorkuta in the Canadian Soccer League. In his debut season with Vorkuta he featured in the CSL Championship final against Scarborough SC and assisted in securing the championship. In 2021, he assisted in securing Vorkuta's third regular season title. He also played in the 2021 playoffs where Vorkuta was defeated by Scarborough in the championship final.

Honors 
FC Vorkuta

 CSL Championship: 2020 
Canadian Soccer League Regular Season: 2021

References  
 

1993 births
Living people
Association football defenders
Ukrainian footballers
FC Shakhtar Sverdlovsk players
FC Krystal Kherson players
FC Poltava players
NK Veres Rivne players
FC Inhulets Petrove players
FC Inhulets-2 Petrove players
Toronto Atomic FC players
FC Continentals players
Ukrainian Second League players
Ukrainian First League players
Canadian Soccer League (1998–present) players